"Bad Girls" is a song by American singer Donna Summer from her 1979 seventh studio album of the same name. It was released as the album's second single on June 23, 1979, by Casablanca Records. The song was produced by Summer's regular collaborators Giorgio Moroder and Pete Bellotte, and co-written by Summer and the members of Brooklyn Dreams, Bruce Sudano, Edward "Eddie" Hokenson and Joe "Bean" Esposito.

"Bad Girls" became a worldwide success, peaking within the top-ten in seven countries, including Spain and New Zealand. In the United States, it spent five weeks at number one on the Billboard Hot 100, from the weeks of July 14 to August 11, 1979; and sold over two million copies, simultaneously becoming, alongside "Hot Stuff", her most successful single. The single helped the Bad Girls album to reach multi-platinum status in the United States. Summer placed three songs in the top 12 of the Billboard 1979 Year-End chart, "Bad Girls" at 
number 2, "Hot Stuff" at #7, and "MacArthur Park" at #12.  Additionally,"Heaven Knows". Summer had 3 additional songs released in 1979 and they all made the Billboard 1980 Year-End chart, "Dim All the Lights", "No More Tears (Enough Is Enough)" with Barbra Streisand and "On the Radio".

Background
The inspiration for Summer to write the song came after one of her assistants was offended by a police officer who thought she was a street prostitute.
A rough version of the song had originally been written a couple of years before its release. Casablanca Records' founder Neil Bogart, upon hearing it, wanted Summer to give it to Cher for her upcoming album. Summer refused and put it away for a couple of years.

"Toot Toot! Ah! Beep Beep!," the chanted vocal refrain in the song originates from the Latin boogaloo track "Bang Bang" by the Joe Cuba Sextet (1966). The chant in "Bang Bang" was incorporated into the song after a gig Joe Cuba's sextet played for a black audience that wasn't particularly receptive to mambo or cha cha cha; the audience started chanting as the pianist in the group played a riff.

Record World said that Summers' "sultry reading is perfect for the threatening street theme."

A 12" version of the song was released as a medley with "Hot Stuff". Although "Hot Stuff" was extended for the 12" version, "Bad Girls" remained in the four minutes, fifty-five seconds album version. A demo version of the song was released on the "deluxe edition" of Bad Girls.

Awards and nominations
The song was nominated and won the award for "Favorite Pop/Rock Single" and "Favorite Pop/Rock Female Artist" at the American Music Awards in 1980. Summer was also nominated for the Grammy Award for Best Disco Recording at the 22nd Annual Grammy Awards in 1980.

Charts

Weekly charts

Year-end charts

All-time charts

Certifications and sales

Cover versions
Jamiroquai regularly performed this during live sets. Jay Kay also performed a live version with Anastasia.

British singer Juliet Roberts also did a cover version in 1998.

American rapper Lil' Kim and American singer and drag queen RuPaul recorded a track titled "Bad Girls" for Kim's album The Notorious K.I.M. (2000), interpolating Summer's song; it was, however, leaked before the album release and consequently scrapped.

References

1979 singles
1979 songs
Billboard Hot 100 number-one singles
Cashbox number-one singles
Donna Summer songs
Songs written by Donna Summer
Casablanca Records singles
Song recordings produced by Giorgio Moroder
Song recordings produced by Pete Bellotte
Songs written by Bruce Sudano
Songs about prostitutes
Disco songs